A comedy festival is a celebration of comedy with many shows, venues, comedy performers (such as stand up comics, sketch troupes, variety performers, etc.) and is held over a specific block of time. Normally, each festival has a diverse range of comedy themes and genres.

Comedy festivals

A partial list of well-known comedy festivals includes:
The Portland Comedy Festival
Moontower Comedy Festival
Leicester Comedy Festival (In Leicester, England the UK'S longest running comedy festival and one of top 5 in world)
Algé'rire, In Algiers, Algeria, the largest comedy festival in the country
ComediHa! Fest-Québec (In Québec City, Canada, one of the largest international comedy Festival in the world)
JFL NorthWest
Big Pine Comedy Festival
Edinburgh Festival Fringe
Glasgow International Comedy Festival (Europe's largest comedy festival)
Melbourne International Comedy Festival
FunnyFest Calgary Comedy Festival
YYComedy Festival
Cologne Comedy Festival
Just for Laughs (Montreal, Canada) (Largest international comedy festival in the world)
Iowa Comedy Festival
Birmingham Comedy Festival
Great Plains Comedy Festival
Winnipeg Fringe Theatre Festival
HK International Comedy Festival
Ha Ha Harvest Comedy Festival - Portland
Kilkenny Cat Laughs Comedy Festival
Perth International Comedy Festival
Sydney Comedy Festival
World's Funniest Island
New Zealand International Comedy Festival
Busan International Comedy Festival
Lucille Ball Comedy Festival
Xanthi Comedy Festival - Greece
Bris Funny Fest
Stand Up Fest - Indonesia
Brisbane Comedy Festival
SF Sketchfest - San Francisco Comedy Festival
Toronto Sketch Comedy Festival
Machynlleth Comedy Festival, Machynlleth, Wales

See also
 List of improvisational theater festivals

References

External links

Comedy
Comedy festivals
Stand-up comedy